Daphnella pulchrelineata is a species of sea snail, a marine gastropod mollusc in the family Raphitomidae.

Description
The length of the shell varies between 6 mm and 17 mm.

Distribution
This marine species was found off Mactan & Olango Islands, Philippines.

References

 Stahlschmidt P., Poppe G.T. & Chino M. (2014) Description of seven new Daphnella species from the Philippines (Gastropoda: Raphitomidae). Visaya 4(2): 29-38 page(s): 33.

External links
 Gastropods.com: Daphnella pulchrelineata

pulchrelineata
Gastropods described in 2014